Solute carrier family 12 member 7 is a protein that in humans is encoded by the SLC12A7 gene.

See also 
 Solute carrier family
 cotransporter

References

Further reading 

 
 
 
 
 
 
 

Solute carrier family